Kadın was the title given to the imperial consort of the Sultan of the Ottoman Empire towards the beginning of the seventeenth century. The title came into official usage at the end of the century, and remained in usage until the nineteenth and twentieth centuries.

Ranks and titles
A  was a titled consort, and recognised as such by the Sultan. The sultans usually had four s, although they might have more over a lifetime, because from time to time, one would die or be retired to the Old Palace, or were divorced.

Status and promotion
The s were chosen from among the s. They had their own apartments within the harem, or sometimes isolated kiosks. In the nineteenth century, they had two rooms on the second floor of the palace, one facing the Bosphorus Straits, and serving as a salon, and the other facing the palace gardens, and serving as a bedroom. They had their personal servants. Each  had her 'night turn'. Sometimes she was invited to dine with the sultan, and when this happened in the early years of the Ottoman dynasty, she used to sit at a separate table.

The s were not permitted to receive outside visitors or to leave the palace except to accompany the sultan to another of his abodes. When they left Topkapı Palace for one of the other places, the utmost care was taken to prevent them from being seen. They left the palace before sunrise, were driven through the palace grounds in curtained carriages, and covered with shawls. A long line of imperial carriages would be formed according to protocol. They embarked from Yalı Köşkü in boats where they were seated in enclosures. The whole convoy was closely guard by other boats. The s were allowed to join Friday mosque processions if they wished.

Each  received an allowance from the state according to her rank. In the eighteenth century the senior  was given ten  (piasters), or 5,000 , while the other s were allocated allowance according to their ranks. In the nineteenth century it was 20,000 . The s were subjected to the same law of inheritance as the other women in the harem. However, they were usually buried in places of honour. In the nineteenth century, if a  died, the laying out of the corpse and the wrapping in the winding sheet took place at the Topkapı Palace. The cloths and sashes laid over them were there. The s received two sashes.

If the valide sultan were deceased, authority over the harem devolved to the senior , a position appointed by the monarch for life.

The s, who ranked below the s, could only take the position of the s if one of them died, or was divorced. If a vacancy arose among the s, the senior  was moved up to  status. Upon the death of a sultan, any of his s who had not borne a child, or who had born a child who had died, was married to a statesman. The others retired to the Old Palace.

List of senior consorts

See also 
 List of Ottoman titles and appellations
 Hatun
 Haseki Sultan
 Ikbal (title)
 Valide Sultan
 Cariye

References

Sources

 
 
 
 
 

Ottoman titles
Concubinage
Concubines of the Ottoman Empire